Per Erik Granström (194224 July 2011) was a Swedish politician and member of the Riksdag, the national legislature. A member of the Social Democratic Party, he represented Dalarna County between October 1991 and October 2006. He was also a substitute member of the Riksdag for Odd Engström between September 1991 and October 1991. He died on 24 July 2011 aged 69.

References

1942 births
2011 deaths
Members of the Riksdag 1991–1994
Members of the Riksdag 1994–1998
Members of the Riksdag 1998–2002
Members of the Riksdag 2002–2006
Members of the Riksdag from the Social Democrats